Gothenburg Horse Show is an international horse show held annually in the Scandinavium arena in Gothenburg, Sweden. The event has been arranged since 1977 and is often held in the spring.

External links 
 

Agricultural shows
Equestrian venues
Show jumping events
Dressage events
Sports competitions in Gothenburg
Agriculture in Sweden
Equestrian sports competitions in Sweden
1977 establishments in Sweden
Recurring sporting events established in 1977
Horse driving competition
Spring (season) events in Sweden